The table below shows all results of Hyundai Motorsport in World Rally Championship.

FIA 2-Litre Cup for Manufacturers

World Rally Championship 

* Season still in progress.

WRC2 results

* Season still in progress.

References
 results at juwra.com
 eWRC-Results.com

External links

 

result
World Rally Championship constructor results